Skin Deep is a 1989 American romantic sex comedy film  written and directed by Blake Edwards and starring John Ritter.

Plot
Zachary "Zach" Hutton is a successful author who has a weakness for alcohol and beautiful women. Zach's mistress walks in on him in the process of cheating on her with her attractive hairdresser, followed by his estranged wife Alex discovering his mistress about to shoot him with his revolver. Following the breakup of those relationships, Zach engages in a long period of binge-drinking and solace-seeking with a string of women. He avoids work, continues to strain relations with his ex-wife and drunkenly attends a formal party dressed in a genie's costume.

Zach's affairs include one with a volatile woman named Molly who deliberately leaves him hooked up too long to a skin-treatment electro-therapy machine that gives his body quivering spasms from head to toe. He also has a one-night stand with a remarkably muscular female bodybuilder named Lonnie, telling her before sex that he feels "like Mrs. Arnold Schwarzenegger." One gag scene is portrayed in total darkness, with Zach wearing a luminous condom as he prepares to have sex with yet another woman he has just met, Amy. When her boyfriend returns to the hotel room similarly equipped, the two men engage in a frantic fight, their glow-in-the-dark attire bouncing crazily across the darkened room.

After disrupting his ex-wife's wedding day, it finally dawns on Zach just how out of control his lifestyle has become. He sobers up, abstains from womanizing, and begins to write again. Achieving the trifecta of recovery that Alex predicted he couldn't achieve, he wins back her love.

Cast

John Ritter as Zachary "Zach" Hutton
Vincent Gardenia as Barney the Barkeeper
Alyson Reed as Alexandra "Alex" Hutton
Joel Brooks as Jake Fedderman
Julianne Phillips as Molly
Chelsea Field as Amy McKenna
Peter Donat as Leon "Sparky" Sparks
Don Gordon as Curt Ames
Nina Foch as Marge, Alex's Mother
Denise Crosby as Angela "Angie" Smith
Michael Kidd as Dr. Westford
Dee Dee Rescher as Bernice Fedderman
Bryan Genesse as Rick Curry
Bo Foxworth as Greg
Raye Hollitt as Lonnie Jones
Brenda Swanson as Emily
Jean Marie McKee as Rebecca "Becky"

Reception

Critical reception
The film received mixed to negative reviews. The film earned a 32% "Rotten" rating on Rotten Tomatoes, based on 28 critics, with an average rating of 5.10/10. On Metacritic, the film has a weighted average score of 43 out of 100 based on 12 critics, indicating "mixed or average reviews".

However, many critics praised John Ritter's performance in the film.  One of the few positive reviews was by Roger Ebert, who wrote, "The daring thing Edwards does in Skin Deep is to try to combine two entirely different tones within the same film. This is a smart, sensitive film that knows a lot about human nature."

Box office
Despite negative reviews, the film was a financial success grossing $20 million in the United States and Canada and $25 million internationally, for a worldwide total of $45 million.

Soundtrack
"Falling Out of Love" performed by Ivan Neville
"Just to Keep You Satisfied" performed by Marvin Gaye
"I Can't Go Home" performed by The Robert Cray Band
"It's Just a Matter of Time" performed by Brook Benton
"Skin Deep" performed by Debra Holland
"Songbird" performed by Kenny G
"Dreamin'" performed by Vanessa Williams
"Eine Kleine Nachtmusik" performed by The Falla Trio
"Have You Met Miss Jones?" written by Richard Rodgers and Lorenz Hart (not credited in the film)
"My Romance" written by Richard Rodgers and Lorenz Hart (not credited in the film)
Film score and additional incidental music by Henry Mancini (not credited in the film)
Additional incidental music by Cole Porter (not credited in the film)

The song "Killer Love" by Al Jarreau was intended to be used in the film, but was omitted at the last minute. The song was released on Jarreau's 1988 album Heart's Horizon.

References

External links
 

1989 films
1980s sex comedy films
1989 romantic comedy films
Films about alcoholism
Films directed by Blake Edwards
Films with screenplays by Blake Edwards
American sex comedy films
American romantic comedy films
Films about writers
Films shot in Los Angeles
Films set in Los Angeles
American independent films
Morgan Creek Productions films
20th Century Fox films
1980s English-language films
Films scored by Henry Mancini
1980s American films